The 1989 Bausch & Lomb Championships was a women's tennis tournament played on outdoor clay courts at the Amelia Island Plantation on Amelia Island, Florida in the United States that was part of the Category 5 tier of the 1989 WTA Tour. The tournament was held from April 10 through April 16, 1989. Third-seeded Gabriela Sabatini won the singles title.

Finals

Singles

 Gabriela Sabatini defeated  Steffi Graf 3–6, 6–3, 7–5
 It was Sabatini's 2nd title of the year and the 20th of her career.

Doubles

 Larisa Savchenko /  Natasha Zvereva defeated  Martina Navratilova /  Pam Shriver 7–6(7–4), 2–6, 6–1
 It was Savchenko's 1st title of the year and the 11th of her career. It was Zvereva's 1st title of the year and the 3rd of her career.

References

External links
 ITF tournament edition details
 Tournament draws

Bausch and Lomb Championships
Amelia Island Championships
Bausch and Lomb Championships
Bausch and Lomb Championships
Bausch and Lomb Championships